Ethel May Dell Savage (2 August 1881 – 17 September 1939), known by her pen name, Ethel M. Dell, was a British writer of over 30 popular romance novels and several short stories from 1911 to 1939.

Biography
Dell was born on 2 August 1881 to a middle class family in Streatham, a suburb of London, England. Her father was a clerk in the City of London and she had an older sister and brother. Dell began to write stories while very young and many of them were published in popular magazines. Her stories were mainly romantic in nature, set in the British Raj and other old British colonial possessions. Her stories were considered by some to be overly sexual. Her cousins were known to tally the number of times she used the words passion, tremble, pant and thrill. 

Dell worked on The Way of an Eagle, her first novel, for several years, finally publishing it under T. Fisher Unwin after being rejected eight times by other publishers. The book was included in Unwin's First Novel Library, a series which highlighted a writer's first book. The Way of an Eagle was published in 1911 and had gone through thirty printings by 1915.

In 1922, Ethel married a soldier, Lieutenant-Colonel Gerald Tahourdin Savage, who resigned his commission at his marriage, making Dell the sole support of the family. Despite unfavorable reviews from critics, she developed a strong fan base, earning from £20,000 to £30,000 a year. Her husband devoted himself to her and fiercely guarded her privacy. Dell continued writing, eventually producing about thirty novels and several volumes of short stories over the course of her life.

Dell died of cancer on 17 September 1939 at age 58.

Pictures of her are very rare and she was never interviewed by the press.

References in literature
The protagonist of George Orwell's  novel Keep the Aspidistra Flying, makes several negative comments about Dell and other authors (notably Warwick Deeping), specifically mentioning The Way of an Eagle. He also refers to her in answers to The Cost of Letters (1946), a questionnaire on the subject of earning a living by writing.

Noel Coward in the introduction to Three Plays writes, “There will always be a public for the Cinderella story, the same as there will always be a public for Miss Ethel M. Dell and the Girls Companion. In the world of amusement it is essential for someone to cater for the illiterate ...”

The titular character of Winifred Watson's novel Miss Pettigrew Lives for a Day refers to Dell as the source of her inspiration to encourage a young gentleman to punch a rival by hissing, "Sock him one" at the key moment.

In Richard Hughes's In Hazard, the engineer Souter aboard the steamer Archimedes has a nightmare about the late chief engineer who was lost at sea. Rather than try to sleep, he begins to read a book by Ethel M. Dell.

P. G. Wodehouse refers to Dell in several of his stories. Some have opined that Wodehouse's character Rosie M. Banks is based on Dell; however, Wodehouse himself told his biographer Richard Usborne that Rosie is based on Ruby M. Ayres. Wodehouse also mentions Dell by name in his novel Uncle Dynamite (1948), whose hero, Bill Oakshott, is several times encouraged to model himself on the masterful man in The Way of an Eagle. He also wrote the short story "Honeysuckle Cottage", which uses themes and characters very like those of Ethel M. Dell. In it, a writer of Raymond Chandler-like hard-boiled detective stories finds to his horror that his work (and later his whole life) is being possessed by characters who seem to come out of a syrupy romance novel by "Leila M. Pinkney". Here is a sample:

D.H.Lawrence mentions Dell in the second draft of "The First Lady Chatterly" (Mondadori 1954), published as "John Thomas And Lady Jane" in 1972.

In Cornelia Otis Skinner's popular Our Hearts Were Young and Gay (1942), the narrator says her travel-mate was well read but that she herself "had a secret letch for Ethel M. Dell."

In M. John Harrison's novel The Centauri Device, "a calf-bound set of Ethel M. Dell firsts, signed and numbered by the author" are part of the detritus of the 20th Century arranged with other objets d'art at a narcotics party on 24th century Earth.

In Gladys Mitchell's The Saltmarsh Murders, the curate mentions Ethel M. Dell.

In Dorothy Sayers's novel The Unpleasantness at the Bellona Club, first published in 1928, Ethel M. Dell is mentioned as an example of escapist literature. "Servants and factory girls read about beautiful girls loved by dark, handsome men, all covered over with jewels and moving in scenes of gilded splendour. And passionate spinsters read Ethel M. Dell. And dull men in offices read detective stories."

Kenneth Halliwell and Joe Orton 'interfered' with the cover of a library copy of Storm Drift., This defacement is, at first glance, designed to affront "Romance" writing but the complexity of this collage and that of many other library books carried out between 1960 and April, 1962 has yet to be completely unravelled.

Ogden Nash mentions her by name in his poem, "I Always Say A Good Saint Is No Worse Than A Bad Cold."

Bibliography

Filmography 
The Way of an Eagle (UK, 1918)
The Safety Curtain (1918)
Keeper of the Door (UK, 1919)
The Rocks of Valpre (UK, 1919)
The Swindler (UK, 1919)
The Hundredth Chance (UK, 1920)
The Tidal Wave (UK, 1920)
A Question of Trust (UK, 1920)
Bars of Iron (UK, 1920)
A szerelem mindent legyőz (Hungary, 1921, based on the novel The Way of an Eagle)
Greatheart (UK, 1921)
The Place of Honour (UK, 1921)
The Knave of Diamonds (UK, 1921)
The Woman of His Dream (UK, 1921)
The Prey of the Dragon (UK, 1921)
Lamp in the Desert (UK, 1922)
The Knight Errant (UK, 1922)
The Experiment (UK, 1922)
The Eleventh Hour (UK, 1922)
A Debt of Honour (UK, 1922)
Her Own Free Will (1924)
The Top of the World (1925)
The Rocks of Valpre (UK, 1935)

Further reading
The Book World: Selling and Distributing British Literature, 1900-1940, BRILL (2016)

References

 Sources consulted (biography) 

 

 Sources consulted (bibliography)

External links
 Information
 
 Public domain online works
 
 
  
 
 Works by Ethel M. Dell at Classic Reader – not duplicated with Gutenberg

1881 births
1939 deaths
20th-century English novelists
20th-century British short story writers
20th-century English women writers
People from Streatham
English romantic fiction writers
Writers from London
Women romantic fiction writers
Deaths from cancer